Titusville is an unincorporated community located within Hopewell Township in Mercer County, New Jersey, United States. The area includes a post office with its own ZIP code (08560), several restaurants, gas stations, a firehouse, and a small cluster of homes. The Washington Crossing State Park, dedicated to George Washington's crossing of the Delaware River in 1776, is adjacent to the community.

History
Titusville's central feature is a small village that sits on a bluff overlooking a picturesque stretch of the Delaware River with stairwells connecting the village to private docks on the river. The Feeder Canal for the Delaware and Raritan Canal runs parallel to the river just to the east of the village, which is connected to River Road (Route 29) by several two-lane bridges. A biking/walking trail follows the canal, constructed when the former Belvidere-Delaware Railroad line was removed in the early 1980s. Opposite the canal from the river, extending eastward, are a number of small residential streets, a county park centered about Baldpate Mountain, and the homes ringing the base of the mountain and county park.

Titusville is just north of the Johnson Ferry House in adjacent Washington Crossing, the scene of George Washington's crossing of the Delaware River during the American Revolutionary War. In 1831, the ferry was replaced by the Washington Crossing Bridge, linking it with Washington Crossing in Pennsylvania.

Titusville is home to Janssen Pharmaceuticals Inc., a division of Johnson and Johnson.

In 1851, the Belvidere-Delaware Railroad opened to Titusville and a station was built in the town. Passenger service ceased at Titusville in April 1952 but passenger trains to other towns continued operating until October 1960. Freight continued to run on this portion of the line until 1976. Track was subsequently removed for the Delaware & Raritan Canal State Park recreational trail in the early 1980s.

Historic district

The Titusville Historic District was added to the National Register of Historic Places on March 17, 1983 for its significance in architecture, industry, religion, and transportation. It includes 100 contributing buildings.

Geography
The community is bisected by state New Jersey Route 29, a busy road that conveys traffic along the Delaware River.

Washington Crossing State Park is an  tract of woods, fields, and streams. The park covers the gradual slope from Bear Tavern Road down to the Delaware River.

Notable people

People who were born in, residents of, or otherwise closely associated with Titusville include:
 William H. Blackwell (1882–1963), fruit farmer and politician.
 Robyn Jones (born 1985), professional soccer goalkeeper who played two years for the Philadelphia Independence of Women's Professional Soccer.

Gallery

See also
 Howell Living History Farm
 Central Delaware Valley AVA
 Washington Crossing Historic Park

References

External links
 First Presbyterian Church of Titusville

Hopewell Township, Mercer County, New Jersey
Unincorporated communities in Mercer County, New Jersey
Unincorporated communities in New Jersey
National Register of Historic Places in Mercer County, New Jersey
Historic districts on the National Register of Historic Places in New Jersey
New Jersey populated places on the Delaware River